Childerich may refer to:

 Childeric (disambiguation), any of several Frankish kings
 Childerich, a Suikoden V character, see: List of Suikoden V characters#Childerich